{{Infobox podcast
| title = Innovation Crush”
| image = File:Innovation Crush.png
| hosting = Chris Denson
| language = English
| length = 30–80 minutes
| began = 
| genre = Comedy, Interview
| url = 
| num_episodes = 236
}}Innovation Crush'' is a weekly podcast hosted by American innovation expert Chris Denson. The show launched in September 2013 and is part of the Wondery podcast network.

Background
Denson currently serves as the Director of Ignition Factory, leading innovation at Omnicom Group, one of the world's largest media agencies. While leading innovation and marketing efforts for brands and corporations, Denson was approached by Sideshow Network, a division of Levity Entertainment Group to create a podcast series for marketers.  After a few development meetings, Innovation Crush was launched.  Focusing on cutting-edge creativity in business, technology and culture, Denson began "Innovation Crush" by interviewing the type of industry leading professionals and entrepreneurs he was working with already. His personal motto is, “Change the way you look at things, and the things you look at will begin to change.” Speaking on "Innovation" overall, Denson explained to Forbes, "The more limited you are, the more creative you have to be. Time constraints eliminate second guesses. Constraint is a unifier.” 

In December 2016, Pat O’Brien of Business Rockstars profiled Denson his series, where Denson explained, “whether you're a mom trying to figure out a new way to motivate your kids, or the CEO of GE, there's always a new plateau to reach."

Reception
On episode #78 Denson interviewed Lee David Zlotoff, creator of the series MacGyver about innovation both in terms of how he as a writer has utilized his subconscious mind to solve problems. The character, MacGyver, was popular around the world because he was able to solve problems with his brain instead of a gun. Lee David Zlotoff explains his view of innovation and what his process is like as a writer.

The podcast has put together partnerships with outlets such as Inc. Magazine, SXSW, Delta Airlines, Dell and AT&T. In 2016 Denson was profiled by Blavity, Business Rockstars, Breakout, The People Series and in October 2016 he was named by Adweek as one of the "12 Most Successful Media Agency Execs in Southern California."

References

External links

Comedy and humor podcasts
Audio podcasts
2013 podcast debuts